Heteropsis is a genus of plants in the family Araceae, native to Central and South America.

Species
 Heteropsis boliviana Rusby - Bolivia
 Heteropsis croatii M.L.Soares - Peru, northwestern Brazil
 Heteropsis duckeana M.L.Soares - northwestern Brazil
 Heteropsis ecuadorensis Sodiro - Ecuador
 Heteropsis flexuosa (Kunth) G.S.Bunting - Colombia, Venezuela, the Guianas, Ecuador, Peru, Bolivia, northwestern Brazil
 Heteropsis linearis A.C.Sm. - Peru, northwestern Brazil
 Heteropsis longispathacea Engl. - northwestern Brazil
 Heteropsis macrophylla A.C.Sm. - Amazonas State of northwestern Brazil
 Heteropsis melinonii (Engl.) A.M.E.Jonker & Jonker - Venezuela, the Guianas
 Heteropsis oblongifolia Kunth - Central America, Colombia, Peru, Bolivia, Brazil
 Heteropsis peruviana K.Krause - Ecuador, Peru, Bolivia, northwestern Brazil
 Heteropsis rigidifolia Engl. - southeastern Brazil
 Heteropsis robusta (G.S.Bunting) M.L.Soares - Colombia, Venezuela, Peru, Ecuador, northwestern Brazil
 Heteropsis salicifolia Kunth - eastern Brazil
 Heteropsis spruceana Schott - Colombia, Venezuela, the Guianas, Ecuador, northwestern Brazil
 Heteropsis steyermarkii G.S.Bunting - Colombia, Venezuela, French Guinea, Peru, northwestern Brazil
 Heteropsis tenuispadix G.S.Bunting - Colombia, Venezuela, the Guianas, Peru, Bolivia, northwestern Brazil

References

External links
Heteropsis on theplantlist.org
CATE Heteropsis page

Monsteroideae
Araceae genera